This is the family tree of the British royal family, from James I (who united the crowns of England and Scotland) to the present monarch, Charles III.

Before James VI and I
See Family tree of English monarchs, Family tree of Scottish monarchs, and Family tree of Welsh monarchs. This also includes England, Scotland and Wales; all part of the United Kingdom as well as the French Norman invasion.
For a simplified view, see: Family tree of British monarchs.

Key
  : Red borders indicate British monarchs
  : Bold borders indicate legitimate children of British monarchs

House of Stuart

House of Hanover

House of Saxe-Coburg and Gotha / House of Windsor

See also
 House of Windsor
 House of Stuart
 House of Hanover
 Family tree of British monarchs
 Alternative successions of the English crown
 Line of succession to the British throne
 Monarchy of the United Kingdom
 List of English monarchs

Notes

References

 
 
 

Family Tree
British Monarchs